Afrasura hieroglyphica is a moth of the subfamily Arctiinae first described by George Thomas Bethune-Baker in 1911. It is found in Angola, Cameroon, Guinea, Nigeria and Uganda.

References

Moths described in 1911
hieroglyphica
Insects of Cameroon
Insects of Uganda
Insects of Angola
Insects of West Africa
Moths of Africa